Actephila is a genus of plants in the family Phyllanthaceae, first described as a genus in 1826. It is one of 8 genera in the tribe Poranthereae, and is most closely related to Leptopus.  The name of the genus is derived from two Greek words, akte, "the seashore", and philos, "loving". It refers to a coastal habitat.

Actephila consists of monoecious trees, shrubs, and subshrubs. The genus is not well understood and is in much need of revision. It is native to Southeast Asia, China, the Himalayas, Papuasia and northern Australia.

Species

Formerly included
moved to other genera: Cleidion Excoecaria Pentabrachion Phyllanthus

References

External links 
 Actephila At:ING At: References At: NMNH Department of Botany At: Research and Collections At: Smithsonian National Museum of Natural History
 CRC World Dictionary of Plant Names: A-C At: Botany & Plant Science At: Life Science At: CRC Press

 
Phyllanthaceae genera
Taxa named by Carl Ludwig Blume